Richard E. Waters (born 18 May 1945) is an English former footballer who played as a goalkeeper in the Football League for Darlington, and in non-league football for Blyth Spartans and Gateshead. As a 19-year-old amateur standing in for Ray Snowball, Waters played twice in the Fourth Division in March 1965, in a 2–1 defeat at home to Torquay United and a 3–0 loss away to Chesterfield.

References

1945 births
Living people
Footballers from Gateshead
English footballers
Association football goalkeepers
Blyth Spartans A.F.C. players
Darlington F.C. players
Gateshead F.C. players
English Football League players